The Liverpool Steamship Owners Association was founded in 1858 to bring together the major shipping lines and express their collective views to the newly formed Mersey Docks and Harbour Board in Liverpool, England. It grew to have an influence on national as well as local affairs.

Chairmen
 David MacIver
 Thomas Hughes Jackson
 Sydney Jones
 Nicholas Cayzer, 1944

References

1858 establishments in England
Organizations established in 1858
Organisations based in Liverpool
Professional associations based in the United Kingdom
Liverpool docks
Shipping in England